Karl Friberg (born 25 March 1999) is a Swedish tennis player.

Friberg has a career high ATP singles ranking of 458 achieved on 10 October 2022. In the ATP doubles ranking he has a career high ranking of 701 achieved on 9 March 2020.

Career
Friberg made his ATP main draw debut at the 2021 Stockholm Open after entering the doubles main draw as an alternate with Mohamed Safwat.

ITF Futures Titles

Singles: (4)

Doubles: (2)

References

External links

1999 births
Living people
Swedish male tennis players
Tennis players from Stockholm
Sportspeople from Örebro